Samoilenko or Samoylenko is a Ukrainian surname. Notable people with the surname include:

 Anatoly Samoilenko (1938–2020), Ukrainian mathematician
 Ihor Samoylenko (born 2002), Ukrainian footballer
 Illia Samoilenko (born 1994), Ukrainian soldier, taken prisoner after the Battle of Mariupol
 Petr Samoylenko (born 1977), Russian basketball player
 Vyacheslav Samoylenko (born 1992), Ukrainian footballer

See also
 
 

Ukrainian-language surnames